Estill is a surname. Notable people with the surname include:

Ella Howard Estill
Jim Estill (born 1957), Canadian businessman
Jo Estill (1921–2010), American singer and vocal coach
Michelle Estill (born 1962), American golfer
Robert W. Estill (1927–2019), American Anglican bishop